Jalan Langgar also known as Jalan Pahang Tua (Pahang state route C103) is a major road in Pahang, Malaysia.

List of junctions

Roads in Pahang